The Royal Society of Arts and Sciences of Uppsala, is a Swedish royal academy in Uppsala. The society was founded on 8 October 1954 and received a royal charter in 1957.

External links
 Official home page

Sciences, Society
Uppsala University